The National Workers' Union of Venezuela (UNT) is a federation of labor unions in Venezuela that was founded in 2003. The union was created by supporters of Venezuelan president Hugo Chávez to challenge the Workers' Confederation of Venezuela (CTV).

See also

Confederación de Trabajadores de Venezuela

National federations of trade unions
Trade unions in Venezuela
Economy of Venezuela
Society of Venezuela
Trade unions established in 2003
2003 establishments in Venezuela
Bolivarian Revolution